The Rainbowmaker is a 2008 Georgian film directed by Nana Jorjadze.

Plot 
Datho (Merab Ninidze) has been innocent in prison for many years. When he comes home nobody wants him. His angelic wife Elene (Anja Antonowicz) has fun with a fire-eater. The two children imagined the father as a hero, not as a sorrowful knight. But everything changes when Datho reveals he has the ability of weather modification. He can freeze his enemies in the bathtub or he calls for rain so that they remain stuck in the mud.

Cast 
 Merab Ninidze : Datho
 Anja Antonowicz : Elene
 Chulpan Khamatova : Lia
 Nino Kirtadze : Lady Death
 Ramaz Chkhikvadze : Grandfather Georgi
 Elene bezarashvili/helen nelson : Lika
 Iva Gogitidze : Lascha
 Tika Chachua : Rada
 Thomas Urb  : Zorab

References

External links

2008 films
Films directed by Nana Jorjadze
Drama films from Georgia (country)